Robert James Worley (1850–1930) was a British architect.

Early life
He was the brother of fellow architect Charles Worley.

Career
Allinson states that Robert Worley, of the architectural practice Worley & Saunders, was "involved in all kinds of speculative developments". He and his brother Charles are listed jointly as the architects of 41 Harley Street.

Robert Worley and James Ebenezer Saunders formed the architectural practice Worley & Saunders.

Worley designed Sicilian Avenue, Holborn and the London Pavilion (now part of the Trocadero Centre), Piccadilly Circus, and Albert Court, a mansion block next to the Royal Albert Hall, all of which are now Grade II listed).

Buildings
His surviving buildings include:
 41 Harley Street, jointly with Charles Worley
 London Pavilion with James Ebenezer Saunders (1885)
 Arundel House, 22 The Drive, Hove (1899)
 Sicilian Avenue, London (1910)

References

Architects from London
1850 births
1930 deaths